Henry Tsang (born 1964 in Hong Kong) is a contemporary Canadian artist.

Life
Tsang was born November 8, 1964, in Hong Kong and immigrated to Canada with his family in 1968. He lives in Vancouver, where he teaches art at Emily Carr University of Art and Design.

Public works
Tsang's public artwork Welcome to the Land of Light, a 100-metre long sculpture consisting of a welcome message in Chinook Jargon, is permanently installed on the northern side of False Creek, Vancouver. This work uses fibre optic cable lighting and marine-grade aluminum lettering to highlight texts based on translations to and from Chinook Jargon, a 19th-century trade language local to the Northwest Coast, and English. Welcome to the Land of Light speaks to the histories of immigration in Vancouver and the promise of new technologies (fibre optics).

Collections
Tsang's work is included in the Vancouver Public Library's Art Bank collection and in the Canada Council Art Bank.

Awards
In 1993 Tsang received a VIVA award from the Jack and Doris Shadbolt foundation.

References

1964 births
Living people
Canadian contemporary artists
Artists from Vancouver
Academic staff of the Emily Carr University of Art and Design